Lionel Pizzinat (born 8 August 1977 in Vernier) is a Swiss footballer who spent most of his playing career at Servette FC.

Pizzinat started his career at the Geneva club Servette. During the 2001–02 season he moved to the Serie B club A.S. Bari until January 2005, when he moved to their league rival Verona. The following season, he played for Venezia at Serie C2, but on 5 April 2006 Pizzinat returned to Servette at 1. Liga for their team rebuild after they were declared bankrupt.

External links
http://www.footballplus.com/players/6783/Lionel-Pizzinat.html
 

1977 births
Living people
People from the canton of Geneva
Swiss men's footballers
Switzerland under-21 international footballers
Swiss expatriate footballers
Swiss expatriate sportspeople in Italy
Servette FC players
FC Lausanne-Sport players
S.S.C. Bari players
Hellas Verona F.C. players
Venezia F.C. players
Serie B players
Serie C players
Swiss Challenge League players
Swiss Super League players
Expatriate footballers in Italy
Association football defenders